Cougar Stadium may refer to:

 Cougar Stadium (Provo), Utah, thecollege football stadium for the BYU Cougars, now named LaVell Edwards Stadium
 Cougar Stadium (Chicago State), Illinois, the baseball stadium for the Chicago State Cougars
 Cougar Softball Stadium, Houston, Texas, the softball stadium for the Houston Cougars
 Martin Stadium, Pullman, Washington, the college football stadium for the WSU Cougars

See also
 Cougar Park, a rugby league stadium in Keighley, England, which is the home stadium of Keighley Cougars